German submarine U-468 was a Type VIIC U-boat of Nazi Germany's Kriegsmarine during World War II. The submarine was laid down on 1 July 1941 as yard number 299 at the Deutsche Werke yard in Kiel, launched on 16 May 1942 and commissioned on 12 August 1942 under the command of Oberleutnant zur See Klemens Schamong. She sailed on three war patrols and sank only one ship before being sunk by a RNZAF plane on 11 August 1943. The airplane pilot (who died in the action, along with his crew and most of the submariners) was subsequently awarded the Victoria Cross - the only occasion on which a VC has been awarded solely on the testimony of an enemy combatant.

Design
German Type VIIC submarines were preceded by the shorter Type VIIB submarines. U-468 had a displacement of  when at the surface and  while submerged. She had two shafts and two  propellers.

U-468 was fitted with five  torpedo tubes (four fitted at the bow and one at the stern), fourteen torpedoes, one  SK C/35 naval gun, 220 rounds, and one twin  C/30 anti-aircraft gun. The boat had a complement of between forty-four and sixty.

Service history
The boat began her service career by training with the 5th U-boat Flotilla, before moving on to the 3rd flotilla for operations.

First patrol
U-468 sailed for the first time from Kiel on 28 January 1943, stopping briefly at Kristiansand in Norway, before heading out into the mid-Atlantic. On 12 March, U-468 sank the British 6,537 GRT tanker Empire Light southeast of Cape Farewell (Greenland) with two torpedoes. The U-boat arrived at her new home port of La Pallice in occupied France on 27 March.

Second patrol
U-468 departed La Pallice for the mid-Atlantic on 19 April 1943, but had no successes. At 08:35 on 22 May the U-boat came under attack by a Grumman TBF Avenger torpedo bomber of Squadron VC-9 flying from the escort carrier . Barely an hour later another aircraft from the same squadron attacked and the U-boat was damaged. At 15:57, U-468 was attacked for a third time by an aircraft of the Royal Navy's 819 Naval Air Squadron. The boat defended itself with flak without destroying the aircraft. U-468 had suffered serious damage and was forced to abandon her patrol, returning to base on 29 May.

Third patrol and loss
The U-boat sailed for her third and final war patrol on 7 July 1943 from La Pallice. She headed south to the West African coast. There on 11 August, she was attacked and sunk by a B-24 Liberator from 200 Squadron RAF, south-west of Dakar in position . The U-boat's flak hit the aircraft several times and set it on fire, but the Liberator continued to turn into its attack and dropped six depth charges before crashing into the sea, killing all eight crewmen aboard. Two depth charges fell very close to the U-boat with devastating effect. U-468 sank within 10 minutes and less than half the crew managed to abandon ship. Many were injured or poisoned by chlorine gas, and drowned, died of exhaustion, or were killed by sharks. Only the commander and six crewmen managed to haul themselves into a rubber dinghy that floated free from the aircraft wreck, and were picked up by the corvette  on 13 August.

The pilot of the Liberator, Flying Officer Lloyd Allan Trigg RNZAF was subsequently awarded the Victoria Cross for this action. This is the only time such a decoration has been awarded solely on the testimony of an enemy combatant and was the first to be awarded to ASW (anti-submarine-warfare) aircrew.

Wolfpacks
U-468 took part in nine wolfpacks, namely:
 Ritter (11 – 26 February 1943) 
 Burggraf (4 – 5 March 1943) 
 Raubgraf (7 – 16 March 1943) 
 Amsel (29 April – 3 May 1943) 
 Amsel 3 (3 – 6 May 1943) 
 Rhein (7 – 10 May 1943) 
 Elbe 1 (10 – 14 May 1943) 
 Mosel (19 – 23 May 1943) 
 Without name (11 – 29 July 1943)

Summary of raiding history

References

Bibliography

External links

 victoriacross.org.uk : Lloyd Allan Trigg Citation

German Type VIIC submarines
U-boats commissioned in 1942
U-boats sunk in 1943
U-boats sunk by depth charges
U-boats sunk by British aircraft
World War II submarines of Germany
World War II shipwrecks in the Atlantic Ocean
1942 ships
Ships built in Kiel
Maritime incidents in August 1943